University of Tuscia (UNITUS) is a university located in Viterbo, Italy. It was founded in 1979 and comprises 6 faculties.

On 26 February 2019, the President of Republic Sergio Mattarella inaugurated the Italian academic year in Tuscia University. His speech was held after the introductory intervention of Marco Frey, president of the Italian Foundation Global Compact Network. Subsequently, Mattarella came to the Monastery of St. Rose of Viterbo (for a private visit).

Organization
These are the 6 departments in which the university is divided into:

 Department of Agriculture and Forest Sciences
 Department of Ecological and Biological Sciences
 Department of Economy, Engineering, Society and Business
 Department of Innovation in Biological, Agro-Food and Forest Systems
 Department of Linguistic, literary, historical, philosophical and legal studies
 Department of Humanities, Communication and Tourism

Notes

See also 
 List of Italian universities
 Viterbo
 List of forestry universities and colleges
 Orto Botanico dell'Università della Tuscia, the university's botanical garden

External links
 

Tuscia University
Buildings and structures in Viterbo
Educational institutions established in 1979
Education in Lazio
1979 establishments in Italy
Viterbo